The Katrineholm Open was a golf tournament on the Challenge Tour and the Nordic Golf League that was played at Katrineholms Golfklubb in Katrineholm, Sweden. The Swedish Challenge was played for the first time in August 2016, succeeding a Nordic Golf League event first held in July 2011. The event was hosted by Robert Karlsson since 2011.

Winners

Notes

References

External links
Coverage on the Challenge Tour's official site

Former Challenge Tour events
Swedish Golf Tour events
Golf tournaments in Sweden
Sport in Katrineholm
Recurring sporting events established in 2011
2011 establishments in Sweden